Jewel Carmen  (born Florence Lavina Quick; July 13, 1897 – March 4, 1984) was an American silent film actress who appeared in over thirty films, primarily in the late 1910s. In addition to her film career, she was involved in several scandals.

Raised in Portland, Oregon, Carmen began acting in Hollywood at age 15, eventually performing with Keystone Studios. She first garnered public attention for her involvement in a statutory rape case against a 35-year-old automobile dealer in Los Angeles, but the charges against him were ultimately dropped after she could not prove her age.

Carmen resumed her career, appearing in several films throughout the 1910s, including a small role in D. W. Griffith's Intolerance (1916), followed by leads in American Aristocracy (1916) opposite Douglas Fairbanks, and in Frank Lloyd's A Tale of Two Cities (1917). She also starred as Cosette in Lloyd's adaptation of Les Misérables (also 1917). In 1918, she married film director Roland West. Carmen made her final film appearance in West's horror film The Bat (1926).

In December 1935, Carmen drew significant media coverage over the death of actress Thelma Todd, who died of carbon monoxide poisoning in the garage of Carmen and West's Pacific Palisades home. Carmen became embroiled in the investigation after she claimed to have seen Todd on Hollywood Boulevard hours after the time police determined Todd had died. A grand jury ultimately ruled Todd's death accidental. The consensus was that she had inadvertently caused her own death by running her car inside the garage to warm herself after West locked her out of the home. Todd and West had been engaged in a romantic affair at the time. Following Todd's death, Carmen and West divorced. She lived the remainder of her life outside the public eye, then died in an El Cajon nursing home in 1984 at age 86.

Life and career

1897–1912: Early life
Carmen was born Florence Lavina Quick on July 13, 1897 in Portland, Oregon, to Amos William and Minerva Quick. Her father was a native of Kentucky, while her mother was born in Arkansas. Amos worked as a farmer and carpenter to support the family. She had two older sisters, Alice and Edna; one older brother, Fred; one younger sister, Alberta; and a younger brother, Henry. She also had two other sisters, Louella and Florence, both of whom died during her childhood.

Quick spent her early years near Tillamook living on a farm before the family returned to Portland in 1900, where she attended Mount Tabor School and St. Mary's Academy. In 1911, Amos left his wife and children to seek work in Los Angeles.

1912–1916: Career beginnings and scandal
In February 1912, Quick relocated with her mother to Los Angeles, following her father; she aspired to be an actress. Within two weeks, she found work as a film extra for the DeMille Company. Shortly after, her siblings, who had temporarily remained in Portland, also moved to Los Angeles. Quick made her film debut in the 1912 film The Will of Destiny, credited as Florence La Vinci, and subsequently appeared in several films for Keystone Studios, including The Ragtime Band, using the name Evelyn Quick; because the studio mandated performers be 16 years old or older, she lied about her age, claiming to be 17. Throughout early 1913, Carmen appeared in minor roles in numerous films for Mack Sennett under this name.

In April 1913, Quick was involved in one of the first major scandals in Hollywood: A grand jury had indicted 35-year-old William La Casse, a wealthy automobile dealer, on charges of statutory rape. La Casse had initially been investigated over a potential connection to a white slavery ring, but his relationship with a then-15-year-old Quick was subsequently uncovered. However, La Casse denied that the two had been intimate. Quick testified against him in court, also implicating William Hollingsworth, a friend of La Casse, in having intimate relations with her. Quick's elder sister, Alice, also testified that she had witnessed Quick and La Casse together on several occasions. One article covering the case claimed that, during a preliminary examination, it was stated that Quick had purportedly been an orphan, and was adopted by her parents, Amos and Minerva. Because Quick did not possess a birth certificate proving herself a minor, the grand jury attempted to use other means—including sworn testimony from Minerva, as well as the recorded names and birthdates in the Quicks' family Bible—as evidence. However, with the jury lacking sufficient evidence proving Quick's age, and after the failure of two witnesses to appear in court (one of them being Quick), the charges against La Casse were ultimately dropped.

Following the scandal, Quick resumed her career in films using the name Jewel Carmen, and went on to appear in Daphne and the Pirate (1916) opposite Lillian Gish, and in D. W. Griffith's Intolerance (1916).

1917–1921: Lawsuits against Fox

In 1917, Carmen contracted with Fox Film Corporation, but finding the deal unsatisfactory, she opened a new contract with the Keeney Corporation in 1918 while her first contract remained in effect. Fox sent Keeney notice of their prior contract, warning that they would hold Keeney responsible for assisting her in breaking it, and promising to indemnify Keeney against legal retaliation. Carmen launched two lawsuits against Fox, one to attempt to free herself of the obligation of fulfilling her contract, and another to seek redress for their interference with her contract with Keeney.

Key to the issues was the question of where the contracts had been made: New York or California. Fox's offices were located in New York; Carmen was a resident of California. By California law, Carmen was an adult when the contract was signed; by New York law, which granted majority at 21, she was not. If not an adult, she could not be legally held to the document she had signed. Though Carmen initially won the first lawsuit, having the contracts set aside and receiving damages of $43,500 from Fox, the decision was overturned on appeal because she had "unclean" hands, having herself treated Fox unfairly. She won her second case because Fox's interference with her employment with Keeney had been outside the law, though Justice Benjamin N. Cardozo made clear that he did not approve of the legal loophole that allowed Carmen to break her contract with Fox.

In the midst of the ongoing lawsuits, Carmen married film director Roland West. West subsequently cast her as the lead of his 1921 film The Silver Lining, in which she portrayed one of two orphaned sisters who is adopted by a thief. She followed this with the drama Nobody, also released in 1921.

1922–1984: Subsequent scandal and retirement
Following her marriage, Carmen went into semi-retirement, and did not appear in films for five years. She made her final appearance in the horror film The Bat (1926), directed by her husband, West.

Death of Thelma Todd
Carmen later became known for her connection to the scandal surrounding the December 16, 1935 death of actress Thelma Todd. Todd was found deceased from carbon monoxide poisoning in her car, which was parked and running inside the garage of Castillo del Mar, a residence owned by Carmen and West in Pacific Palisades. Castillo del Mar was located only one block away from the Thelma Todd Cafe, a restaurant for which Todd served as the face, and which was financially backed by West and owned by Carmen. At the time of Todd's death, Carmen's parents were residing at Castillo del Mar.

There were a number of factors which made the death suspicious, including that Todd was allegedly spotted or spoken to several times the day after she died; Carmen herself testified before the grand jury that she had seen Todd riding in a phaeton on Hollywood Boulevard around 11:00 p.m. on December 15, hours after police estimated Todd had already died. Claims from staff that Todd had been beaten by an unnamed man at the cafe in the days before her death were also investigated by law enforcement.

West was subject to allegations that he had deliberately shut the garage door while an intoxicated Todd was sleeping in her car. However, Todd's death was ultimately ruled accidental, inadvertently caused by her own actions. Biographer Hans J. Wollstein notes that the rumors surrounding Todd's death involving Carmen and West mostly had "no foundation whatsoever." Following Todd's death, the marriage between Carmen and West ended, and she retired from the public eye.

Death
Carmen died of lymphoma at Helix View Nursing Home in El Cajon, California on March 4, 1984, aged 86.

Filmography

Notes

References

Sources

External links

 
 

1897 births
1984 deaths
20th Century Studios contract players
Actresses from Portland, Oregon
American film actresses
American silent film actresses
American stage actresses
Deaths from cancer in California
Deaths from lymphoma
People from Tillamook County, Oregon
Scandals in California
St. Mary's Academy (Portland, Oregon) alumni
20th-century American actresses